Rainbow Girl (Dori Aandraison of the planet Xolnar) is a fictional character and a DC Comics super heroine.  She first appeared in Adventure Comics #309 (June 1963) as a rejected Legion of Super-Heroes applicant. Her second appearance was 25 years later in Who's Who in the Legion of Super-Heroes #5 as a socialite. She did not appear again for nearly 20 years until Action Comics #862 as a member of the Legion of Substitute Heroes, an organization of teenage heroes that exists one thousand years in a future universe.

Fictional character biography
Dori Aandraison hoped to become a Legionnaire as a stepping stone towards a career as a holovid actress.  She won a trip to Metropolis where Legion tryouts were being held by using her powers in the "Miss Xolnar" contest.  Unfortunately, the Legion rejected her.  Rather than returning to Xolnar, she married Irveang Polamar, a member of one of the oldest and wealthiest families in Metropolis, so she could remain on Earth.  While working on her autobiography, she could not shake her ambition to join the Legion of Super-Heroes so she gave up her life of power lunches and social teas and instead joined the Legion of Substitute Heroes, even though she felt they lacked enough publicity to do her any good.

Dori and the Substitutes assist in overthrowing the speciesist Justice League and saving Earth from an invasion of an alien coalition.

Powers and abilities
Rainbow Girl wields the powers of the mysterious emotional spectrum resulting in unpredictable mood swings.  She was able to tap red (anger), blue (hope) and green (willpower) when she and other substitutes came to the aid of Superman and the Legion of Super-Heroes in their battle against the xenophobic Justice League of Earth.  During the Blackest Night event, Geoff Johns states that she does not fully understand her powers and uses them more for fun.

In her first appearance, Rainbow Girl was  able to create a pheromone field that surrounds her in coruscating light resembling a rainbow, giving her an irresistible personality to everyone.

References

External links
 
 Cosmic Teams!

Characters created by Edmond Hamilton
Characters created by John Forte
Comics characters introduced in 1963